The 2023 Kwik Fit British Touring Car Championship (commonly abbreviated as BTCC) will be a motor racing championship for production-based touring cars held across England and Scotland. The championship will feature a mix of professional motor racing teams and privately funded amateur drivers competing in highly modified versions of family cars which are sold to the general public and conform to the technical regulations for the championship. The 2023 season will be the 66th British Touring Car Championship season and the 13th season for cars conforming to the Next Generation Touring Car (NGTC) technical specification.

Teams and drivers

Entering/re-entering BTCC
 Nick Halstead returned to the series with Bristol Street Motors with Excelr8 TradePriceCars.com, having last raced in 2021 at Croft to replace Rick Parfitt Jr.
 Andrew Watson debuted with CarStore Power Maxed Racing.
 Ronan Pearson debuted with Bristol Street Motors with Excelr8 TradePriceCars.com to replace Jack Butel.
 2022 Ginetta GT5 and BMW Compact Cup winner Mikey Doble debuted with Power Maxed Racing.
Changed teams
 Adam Morgan will move from Car Gods with Ciceley Motorsport to Team BMW.
 Dexter Patterson will move from Laser Tools Racing to Team HARD.
 Dan Lloyd and Jack Butel will move from Bristol Street Motors with Excelr8 TradePriceCars.com to Team HARD.
 Aiden Moffat will move from Laser Tools Racing to Starline Racing by One Motorsport.
 Daniel Rowbottom will move from Halfords Racing with Cataclean to NAPA Racing UK with Cataclean
 Árón Taylor-Smith will move from Yazoo with Safuu.com Racing to CarStore Power Maxed Racing

Leaving BTCC
 Jason Plato retired from the series.
 Ollie Jackson will leave the series and join the 2023 Porsche Carrera Cup Great Britain.

Team changes
 Ciceley Motorsport left the series.
 Laser Tools Racing switched from Aiden Moffat Racing to MB Motorsport
 BTC Racing will rebrand ahead of this season named Starline Racing by One Motorsport.

Race calendar
The 2023 calendar was announced on 31 May 2022. The Grand Prix layout of Donington Park returned to the calendar for the first time since 2002, taking the place of the second Thruxton round.

References

External links
 
 TouringCarTimes

British Touring Car Championship seasons
Touring Car Championship
BTCC